The Fiddler's Fakebook, by David Brody, is a collection of fiddle tunes in lead sheet form (naturally without lyrics). It includes tunes in the following styles:

 England
 Scotland
 Ireland
 Shetland
 French Canadian
 Nova Scotia/Cape Breton
 New England
 Old-Time
 Bluegrass
 Texas Style
 Western Swing

See also
List of North American folk music traditions

Notes

Folk music publications